William Gunnell House may refer to 

William Gunnell House (Fairfax, Virginia), a contributing property of the City of Fairfax Historic District in the National Register of Historic Places listings in Fairfax City, Virginia
 William Gunnell House (Great Falls, Virginia), listed in the National Register of Historic Places listings in Fairfax County, Virginia